Never Could Toe the Mark is an album by American country music artist Waylon Jennings, released on RCA Victor in 1984.

Background
Never Could Toe the Mark was released at a pivotal time for Jennings, who was trying to get sober after over twenty years of drug abuse, beginning with amphetamines in the late 1960s and early 1970s and cocaine into the mid-1980s.  In the audio version of his autobiography Waylon, he recalled that he was in such bad physical shape that he decided to take off April 1984 so he could clean up and get his health back, although he still intended to use:  "I told Jessi [Colter, Waylon's wife] I'd always be a drug addict and I'd always do cocaine, and that this was just temporary, to slow it down."  Jennings rented a house in Arizona and went cold turkey, and it was largely because of his young son Shooter that he decided to quit drugs for good.

Recording and composition
Never Could Toe the Mark would be the singer's next-to-last studio album for RCA and sounds like a stop-gap release as Jennings was in the midst of his rehabilitation.  The album's lone hit single was the title track, which peaked at #6.  Jennings also made a music video for the song which features him playing a mandolin.  For the most part the mood of the album is light, with the singer composing four of the album's ten tracks that celebrate his home state ("People Up in Texas"), outlaw bravado ("Never Could Toe the Mark," "Gemini Song"), and sobriety ("Talk Good Boogie").  A Dixie band makes an appearance on "If She'll Leave Her Mama," a rarity for a Jennings' record.  Jennings continued his longstanding practice of remaking rock and pop songs in his own style as well, covering Billy Joel's "The Entertainer."  He also records his own version of Dire Straits' country-tinged rocker "Setting Me Up." "Sparkling Brown Eyes" is a remake of Bill Cox & Cliff Hobbs song from 1937 that was popularized by Webb Pierce with The Wilburn Brothers in 1954, and by George Jones in 1960.

"Where Would I Be" is the only ballad on the album.  Although written by Paul Kennerley, it is most certainly Waylon's tribute to his wife Jessi Colter, who stuck with him throughout his cocaine addiction and remained a pillar of strength in his recovery.  In the authorized video documentary Renegade Outlaw Legend, the singer recalls, "The look I saw on her face, that drawn look from worry, and just going through hell livin' with me.  I wasn't mean to her but I was never home, I was never there.  And the only time she'd see me is when I'd come in and crash and sleep for days, and she didn't know when I'd sleep if I'd ever wake up."

Never Could Toe the Mark peaked at #20 on the Billboard country albums chart, Jennings' lowest showing since 1971's Cedartown, Georgia.

Track listing
All tracks composed by Waylon Jennings; except where indicated
"Never Could Toe the Mark" – 2:55
"Talk Good Boogie" - 2:19
"People Up in Texas" - 2:23
"Sparkling Brown Eyes" (Bill Cox) - 2:39
"If She'll Leave Her Mama" (Mack Vickery, Lamar Morris) - 2:41
"Settin' Me Up" (Mark Knopfler) - 2:24
"The Gemini Song (When I'm Bad, I'm Bad)" - 2:30
"Where Would I Be" (Paul Kennerley) - 2:47
"Whatever Gets You Through the Night" (Bob McDill) - 3:38
"The Entertainer" (Billy Joel) - 2:45

Production
Producer: Waylon Jennings, Alan Cartee, Brent Cartee, Don Cartee
Art Direction: Hogan Entertainment Design
Photography: Mark Tucker

Personnel

Pickers
Waylon Jennings 
Ralph Mooney
Jerry Bridges
Gary Scruggs
Floyd Domino
Dan Mustoe
Tony Joe White
Jerry Gropp
J. I. Allison
Roger "Rock" Williams & Co.
Don Cartee

Singers
Waylon Jennings
Jessi Colter
Jerry Bridges
Gary Scruggs
Debbie Smith
Kay Milete
Crystal Milete
Angel Milete

Chart performance

References

Waylon Jennings albums
1984 albums
RCA Records albums